Florence Symonds (born 20 May 2002) is a Canadian rugby sevens player. She competed for Canada at the 2022 Rugby World Cup Sevens in Cape Town. They placed sixth overall after losing to Fiji in the fifth place final.

References

2002 births
Living people
Female rugby sevens players
Canada international women's rugby sevens players